Yingli is a Chinese a solar panel manufacturer.

Yingli may also refer to:

 Yingli, Jinzhou, Hebei (营里镇), a township-level division in China
 Yingli Township (营里乡), a township-level division of Pingshan County in Hebei, China
 Yingli Tower, a skyscraper in Chongqing, China